Karkas Rural District is a rural district (dehestan) in the Central District of Natanz County, Isfahan Province, Iran. At the 2006 census, its population was 2,264, in 781 families.  The rural district has 26 villages.

References 

Rural Districts of Isfahan Province
Natanz County